Oosterpark may refer to:
Oosterpark (Amsterdam), a park in Amsterdam
Oosterpark Stadion, an association football stadion in Groningen